Jacob Emmitt (born 4 October 1988) is a Wales international rugby league footballer who plays as a  for the Barrow Raiders in the RFL League 1.

He previously played for the Toronto Wolfpack, St Helens (Heritage № 1173), Castleford Tigers (Heritage № 913), Leigh Centurions, Salford Red Devils and the Swinton Lions. He has also spent time on loan at the Leigh Centurions and the Keighley Cougars.

Background
Emmitt was born in Warrington, Cheshire, England.

Playing career
Emmitt began his career at St Helens. He joined Castleford on a 2-year deal on 16 September 2010. The following month he represented Wales in the Alitalia European Cup.

He signed an 18-month deal with Salford in April 2013, but left Salford and signed a contract to return to Leigh for the 2014 season.

In October and November 2013, He represented Wales in the 2013 Rugby League World Cup.

In October 2014, Emmitt played in the 2014 European Cup.

In October 2016, Emmit played in the 2017 World Cup qualifiers.

Lymm RFC
On 19 June 2020, it was announced that Emmitt would end his professional rugby league career and has joined Lymm RFC

Barrow Raiders
On 3 August 2021, it was reported that he had signed for Barrow in the RFL League 1

References

External links
Toronto Wolfpack profile
(archived by web.archive.org) St Helens profile
Profile at saints.org.uk

1988 births
Living people
AS Carcassonne players
Barrow Raiders players
Castleford Tigers players
English people of Welsh descent
English rugby league players
English rugby union players
Keighley Cougars players
Leigh Leopards players
Lymm RFC players
Rugby league locks
Rugby league players from Warrington
Rugby league props
Rugby league second-rows
Rugby union players from Warrington
Salford Red Devils players
St Helens R.F.C. players
Swinton Lions players
Toronto Wolfpack players
Wales national rugby league team players